Pritam Singh Panwar is an Indian politician and a Uttarakhand Kranti Dal leader and member of the Uttarakhand Legislative Assembly  in India. He was elected from Yamunotri constituency in the 2002 Uttarakhand Legislative Assembly election and 2012. In 2012 Uttarakhand Legislative Assembly election, he defeated Kedar Singh Rawat of Indian National Congress. Panwar has been 3 times MLA from UKD ticket and 1 time independent MLA whereas he won 1 time from BJP ticket.

References

Living people
Uttarakhand MLAs 2022–2027
Uttarakhand Kranti Dal politicians
State cabinet ministers of Uttarakhand
Uttarakhand MLAs 2017–2022
1966 births